Ephedra distachya is a shrub in the family Ephedraceae that stands about 25 cm to 50 cm high. The shrub grows in many parts of the world, including southern and central Europe and western and central Asia. Its local names include somlatha.

Subspecies
Ephedra distachya subsp. distachya – central + southern Europe, southwestern + central Asia
Ephedra distachya subsp. helvetica (C.A.Mey.) Asch. & Graebn. – Switzerland, France, Italy, Slovenia, Austria

History
Ephedra is part of a group of plants called ‘gnetophytes’. These plants have hardly changed in the past 100 million years, and are thought to be relics of an ancient flora. The leaves of Ephedra are tiny and scale-like. Gnetophyte leaves evolved independently from leaves in flowering plants. Ephedra produces the alkaloid ephedrine, which has been shown to interfere with insect thermoregulation and may also have effects on insect neurotransmitters. This may be the method by which the plant deters insect herbivores.

Uses

Ephedra distachya is used to relieve acute muscular and rheumatic pains (when it is called teamsters' tea), as a stimulant, and in the cardio tonics in Ayurveda. It is sometimes identified with the legendary drug soma, as described in the Avesta and the Rig Veda, the respective ancient sacred texts of the Zoroastrian and Hindu faiths.

Ephedrine, an alkaloid, is obtained from its dried branches and is used as a stimulant, often to control asthma. It was isolated from the plant by Nagayoshi Nagai in 1885.  All parts of the plant contain up to 3% ephedrine.

Side effects 
Although Ephedra has many benefits, side effects include insomnia and a fast heart rate.

Gallery

References

External links
 Gymnosperm Database: Ephedra distachya. Retrieved 2017-07-05.

distachya
Flora of Central Asia
Flora of Western Asia
Medicinal plants of Asia
Medicinal plants of Europe
Plants described in 1753
Taxa named by Carl Linnaeus
Stimulants
Soma (drink)